Sasel is a quarter of Hamburg, Germany in the Wandsbek borough.

The current population is 24.223 (31st Dec. 2021).

Sasel consists of good infrastructure. It has three schools and a center which accumulates several supermarkets and stores around the market.

References 

Quarters of Hamburg
Wandsbek